Benacus griseus is a species of giant water bug in the family Belostomatidae. It is the only species in the genus Benacus, which was formerly considered a subgenus of Lethocerus.

Benacus griseus is found throughout eastern North America, from New England, west through southern Ontario and to Nebraska, south to Florida and Texas, along the Gulf of Mexico coast in Mexico, and into Cuba.

Adults reach lengths of 47–64 mm, making them one of the largest aquatic insect species found in eastern North America.

It is distinguished from other Lethocerinae species by the lack of a groove on its front femur. It is also characterized by a wide hind tibia and black ventral stripes.

References

Belostomatidae
Insects described in 1832
Taxa named by Thomas Say
Hemiptera of North America